Oceanco's  Infinity was delivered in 2022 as a replacement for its previous yacht, now named Cloud 9. Her exterior design is the work of Espen Øino and her interior is by Sinot Exclusive Yacht Design and David Kleinberg Design Associates.

Specifications

 Length Overall: 
 Beam Overall: 
 Delivered: 2022
 Classification: Lloyd's Register
 Maximum speed: 
 Material: Steel hull & Aluminium superstructure 
 Naval architect: Lateral Naval Architects
 Exterior designer: Espen Øino
 Interior designer: Sinot Exclusive Yacht Design and David Kleinberg Design Associates

See also 
 Motor yacht
 List of motor yachts by length
 List of yachts built by Oceanco
 Oceanco

References

2022 ships
Motor yachts
Ships built in the Netherlands